Uncial 0245 (in the Gregory-Aland numbering), is a Greek uncial manuscript of the New Testament. Paleographically it has been assigned to the 6th century.

Description 
The codex contains a small part of the 1 John 3:23-4:1,3-6, on 1 parchment leaf (27 cm by 20 cm). Written in one columns per page, 23 lines per page, in uncial letters.

Currently it is dated by the INTF to the 6th century.

It is a palimpsest, the upper text is written in Georgian language.

Location 
Currently the codex is housed at the Selly Oak Colleges (Mingana Georg. 7) in Birmingham.

Text 
The Greek text of this codex is a representative of the Alexandrian text-type. Aland placed it in Category II.

See also 

 List of New Testament uncials
 Textual criticism

References

Further reading 

 Garitte, G., "Les feuillets géorgiens de la collection Mingana a Selly Oak (Birmingham)", Le Muséon 73, (Louvain, 1960), pp. 239-259.
 Greenlee, J. H., "Nine Uncial Palimpsests of the New Testament", Studies & Documents 39 (Salt Lake City, 1968).
 

Greek New Testament uncials
6th-century biblical manuscripts 
Palimpsests